The 2019 Eastern Kentucky Colonels football team represented Eastern Kentucky University during the 2019 NCAA Division I FCS football season. They were led by fourth-year head coach Mark Elder and played their home games at Roy Kidd Stadium as a member of the Ohio Valley Conference. They finished the season 7–5, 5–3 in OVC play to finish in fourth place. Elder was fired following the season, he finished with a record of 21–24.

Previous season

The Colonels finished the 2018 season 7–4, 5–2 in OVC play to finish in third place.

Preseason

Preseason coaches' poll
The OVC released their preseason coaches' poll on July 22, 2019. The Colonels were picked to finish in third place.

Preseason All-OVC team
The Colonels had three players at three positions selected to the preseason all-OVC team.

Offense

Daryl McCleskey Jr. – RB

Defense

Aaron Patrick – DL

Leodis Moore III – DB

Schedule

Game summaries

Valparaiso

at Louisville

at Indiana State

at Presbyterian

Tennessee State

UT Martin

at Murray State

at Eastern Illinois

Austin Peay

at Southeast Missouri State

Tennessee Tech

at Jacksonville State

Ranking movements

References

Eastern Kentucky
Eastern Kentucky Colonels football seasons
Eastern Kentucky Colonels football